The Luhong River, also known as Ying River, is a left-bank tributary of the upper Xiang River in Yongzhou Prefecture, Hunan Province, China. Luhong River rises in Lishuichong of Dasheng Town in the east of the Huanghua Mountains, Dong'an County. The main stream of the Luhong River runs generally northwest to southeast, and it joins the Xiang at Shuijiangkou of Gaoxishi Town, Lengshuitan.

References

Rivers of Hunan